Behesht Shahada (also Romanized as Behesht Shahadā) is a village in Bandar-e Emam Khomeyni Rural District, Bandar-e Emam Khomeyni District, Mahshahr County, Khuzestan Province, Iran. At the 2006 census, its population was 27, in 4 families.

References 

Populated places in Mahshahr County